Daniel Trevor Kedwell (born 3 August 1983) is an English footballer who plays as a forward for Chatham Town where he is also assistant manager. He has spent most of his career playing non-League football, but played in League One and Two during a four-year spell with Gillingham, his hometown club.

Career

Non-League
Born in Gillingham, Kent, Kedwell came through the youth system of Kent-based Chatham Town and played one season for the club before joining Tonbridge Angels in the summer of 2002. His spell at the Longmead Stadium was short-lived when in October 2002 he signed for Fisher Athletic and stayed with the side until January 2003. He had a short spell at Lordswood before joining Maidstone United in the summer of 2003, staying until the end of the following season. Kedwell then signed for Kent League side Herne Bay where he was the top scorer that season finishing with 28 goals in all competitions. This attracted the attention of Conference South side Welling United, who signed the striker in the summer. Kedwell enjoyed two seasons at Welling, scoring 38 league goals, and made a further step up in 2007 when he signed for Conference side Grays Athletic for £12,000, a club record. He spent one full season at the Essex club scoring 13 league goals, and at the end of the season he dropped down a division when he signed for AFC Wimbledon for £10,000. Whilst at the south-west London club, Kedwell found some of the best scoring form of his career, and scored 67 goals in three seasons.

League
Kedwell scored the winning penalty in the 2011 Conference Premier play-off Final penalty shoot-out against Luton Town to send AFC Wimbledon into the Football League. On 1 July 2011, he signed for League Two side Gillingham, his hometown club, for a fee of £60,000. He made his league debut for Gillingham on 6 August in a 1–0 win over Cheltenham Town at Priestfield Stadium. He finished his first season with the Gills as the club's top scorer with a total of 14 goals, 12 of which came in the league.

Kedwell was made captain of Gillingham for their first competitive game of the 2012–13 season in the League Cup against Bristol City. He began the league campaign in with eight goals in the Gills' first ten league matches. Kedwell also managed to score the goal that secured promotion in a 1–0 home victory over Torquay United and scored in a 2–2 draw against his old side AFC Wimbledon which secured the league title for Gillingham. He finished the season once again as the club's top goal scorer, scoring 16 goals in all competitions, 14 of which helped the Gills to win the League Two championship. On 12 May 2014, Kedwell signed a new two-year deal with the "Gills".

Return to Non-League
On 6 January 2015, Kedwell signed an 18-month contract with Conference South side Ebbsfleet United. While with the side he featured in two play-off finals. Kedwell scored two goals in the 2015–16 play-off final but missed the decisive penalty in the shootout as Ebbsfleet lost to Maidstone United. Promotion to the National League was achieved the following season with a 2–1 play-off final win over Chelmsford City.

Kedwell joined Havant & Waterlooville for the 2019–20 season, scoring 11 goals in 26 league appearances before the season was halted in March due to the COVID-19 pandemic.  He was released as a free agent in July 2020.

On 13 August 2020, Kedwell joined Southern Counties East Premier Division side Hollands & Blair. In November 2020, with Blair's league suspended, Kedwell returned to Havant & Waterlooville before their league was curtailed in February 2021.

Following his player-manager role with Cray Wanderers, Kedwell returned to the Southern Counties East Premier Division to join Chatham Town on 31 December 2021, the club he was at as a junior. Following promotion to the Isthmian League, Kedwell went into the 2022–23 season in the role of assistant manager.

Coaching career
On 10 April 2021, Kedwell began his first job in management when he was appointed manager of Cray Wanderers. On 28 December 2021, Kedwell left this role by mutual consent.

Career statistics

Managerial statistics

Honours
AFC Wimbledon
Conference Premier play-offs: 2010–11

Gillingham
Football League Two: 2012–13

Ebbsfleet United
National League South play-offs: 2016–17
Individual

 AFC Wimbledon Player of the Season: 2009–10
 AFC Wimbledon Team of the Decade (2010s)
 Conference Premier Team of the Year: 2010–11
 National League South Team of the Year: 2016–17

References

External links

1983 births
Living people
People from Gillingham, Kent
English footballers
Association football forwards
Chatham Town F.C. players
Tonbridge Angels F.C. players
Fisher Athletic F.C. players
Lordswood F.C. players
Maidstone United F.C. players
Herne Bay F.C. players
Welling United F.C. players
Grays Athletic F.C. players
AFC Wimbledon players
Gillingham F.C. players
Ebbsfleet United F.C. players
Havant & Waterlooville F.C. players
Hollands & Blair F.C. players
Cray Wanderers F.C. players
English Football League players
National League (English football) players
Isthmian League players
English football managers
Cray Wanderers F.C. managers
Isthmian League managers